{{Drugbox
| Verifiedfields = changed
| Watchedfields = changed
| verifiedrevid = 443953677
| IUPAC_name = Ethoxy-''N-{6-[ethyl(2-hydroxypropyl)amino]pyridazin-3-yl}carbohydrazide
| image = Cadralazine.svg
| width = 250
| image2 = Cadralazine-3D-spacefill.png
| width2 = 180
| alt2 = Cadralazine molecule

| tradename = 
| Drugs.com = 
| pregnancy_AU = 
| pregnancy_US = 
| pregnancy_category = 
| legal_AU = 
| legal_CA = 
| legal_UK = 
| legal_US = 
| legal_status = 
| routes_of_administration = 

| bioavailability = 
| protein_bound = 
| metabolism = 
| elimination_half-life = 
| excretion = 

| CAS_number_Ref = 
| CAS_number = 64241-34-5
| ATC_prefix = C02
| ATC_suffix = DB04
| PubChem = 2515
| ChEMBL_Ref = 
| ChEMBL = 2106561
| DrugBank_Ref = 
| DrugBank = 
| UNII_Ref = 
| UNII = 8T96I3U713
| ChemSpiderID_Ref = 
| ChemSpiderID = 2420
| smiles = O=C(OCC)NNc1nnc(N(CC(O)C)CC)cc1
| StdInChI_Ref = 
| StdInChI = 1S/C12H21N5O3/c1-4-17(8-9(3)18)11-7-6-10(13-15-11)14-16-12(19)20-5-2/h6-7,9,18H,4-5,8H2,1-3H3,(H,13,14)(H,16,19)
| StdInChIKey_Ref = 
| StdInChIKey = QLTVVOATEHFXLT-UHFFFAOYSA-N

| C=12 | H=21 | N=5 | O=3 
}}Cadralazine''' is an antihypertensive of the hydrazinophthalazine chemical class.

References 

Secondary alcohols
Carbamates
Hydrazides
Pyridazines